Shankarlal Ghelabhai Banker  (1889 – 1985) was an Indian independence activist. He was one of the early associates of Mahatma Gandhi.

Career 
Banker and his friend Indulal Yagnik had established Young India and Navjivan publications respectively. They had handed over these publications to Mahatma Gandhi when he entered public life in India. He was one of the early associates of Gandhi. On 10 March 1922, Gandhi and Banker, as publisher and editor of Gandhi's newspaper Young India, were accused of treason and arrested. Both Banker and Gandhi pleaded guilty and the trial was set for 18 March. It was held at the Circuit House and many leading Congressmen like Jawaharlal Nehru, Sarojini Naidu and Madan Mohan Malaviya attended. Judge C. N. Broomfield delivered his judgement and Banker was sentenced to a year and a half in jail.

Banker had played a major role in Gandhi's activities in Ahmedabad. He participated in the textile mill workers’ strike in Ahmedabad, the 1918 Kheda Satyagraha and the protests against the Rowlatt Act. He was the secretary of the Bharatiya Charkha Sangh which promoted khadi and Charkha.

References 

Indian independence activists from Gujarat
Gandhians
1889 births
1985 deaths